The 2018 Metro Atlantic Athletic Conference men's basketball tournament was the postseason men's basketball tournament for the Metro Atlantic Athletic Conference for the 2017–18 NCAA Division I men's basketball season. It was held from March 1–5, 2018 at the Times Union Center in Albany, New York. No. 4 seed Iona defeated No. 6 seed Fairfield in the championship game to receive the conference's automatic bid to the NCAA tournament. This was Iona's third consecutive MAAC tournament championship, while also being their MAAC-record leading sixth straight championship game appearance.

Seeds
All 11 teams in the conference participated in the Tournament. The top five teams received byes to the quarterfinals. Teams were seeded by record within the conference, with a tiebreaker system to seed teams with identical conference records.

Schedule

Bracket

All-Championship Team

See also
 2018 MAAC women's basketball tournament

References

MAAC men's basketball tournament
Tournament
MAAC men's basketball tournament
MAAC men's basketball tournament
College basketball tournaments in New York (state)
Basketball competitions in Albany, New York